Nukabad is a city in Sistan and Baluchestan Province, Iran.

Nukabad may also refer to:

Isfahan Province

Kerman Province

Sistan and Baluchestan Province

Chabahar County
 Nukabad, Chabahar, Sistan and Baluchestan Province
 Nukabad, Dashtiari, Chabahar County, Sistan and Baluchestan Province
 Nukabad (25°40′ N 61°25′ E), Dashtiari, Chabahar County, Sistan and Baluchestan Province
 Nukabad-e Janglian, Chabahar County, Sistan and Baluchestan Province
 Nukabad, Pir Sohrab, Chabahar County, Sistan and Baluchestan Province
 Nukabad, Polan, Chabahar County, Sistan and Baluchestan Province

Dalgan County
 Nukabad, Dalgan, a village in Dalgan County
 Nukabad-e Gonbad, a village in Dalgan County

Iranshahr County
 Nukabad, Iranshahr, a village in Iranshahr County
 Nukabad-e Sarhang, a village in Iranshahr County

Khash County
 Nukabad District, in Sistan and Baluchestan Province